Kverkfjöll (1,764 m) is a mountain range situated on the north-eastern border of the glacier Vatnajökull in Iceland. With the glacier Kverkjökull, it is between the Vatnajökull glacier and the Dyngjufjöll mountains. The mountains are active volcanoes. Especially around 1720, they saw frequent eruptions and glacier runs.

Under the mountains, there is a magma chamber which leads to the formation of glacier caves. Currently, they cannot be visited because of the risk of collapse.

The main volume of the Jökulsá á Fjöllum river flows from the Kverkfjöll area.

See also
 Glaciers of Iceland
 Iceland plume
 List of lakes of Iceland
 List of volcanoes in Iceland
 Volcanism of Iceland

External links 
 Kverksfjöll in the Catalogue of Icelandic Volcanoes
 Kverkfjöll - picture gallery from islandsmyndir.is
 Photo
 ice cave

References

Stratovolcanoes of Iceland
Mountains of Iceland
Mountain ranges of Europe
Caves of Iceland
Active volcanoes
North Volcanic Zone of Iceland
One-thousanders of Iceland
Subglacial volcanoes of Iceland
Volcanic systems of Iceland
Calderas of Iceland
Central volcanoes of Iceland